Richmond Lock and Footbridge is a lock, rising and falling low-tide barrage integrating controlled sluices and pair of pedestrian bridges on the River Thames in south west London, England and is a Grade II* listed structure. It is the furthest downstream of the forty-five Thames locks and the only one owned and operated by the Port of London Authority. It was opened in 1894 and is north-west of the centre of Richmond in a semi-urban part of south-west London. Downstream are Syon Park and Kew Gardens on opposite banks. It connects the promenade at Richmond with the neighbouring district of St. Margarets on the west bank during the day and is closed at night to pedestrians – after 19:30 GMT or after 21:30 when BST is in use. At high tide the sluice gates are raised and partly hidden behind metal arches forming twin footbridges.

It was built to maintain the lowest-lying head of water of the forty-five navigable reaches of the Thames above the rest of the Tideway. Below the structure for a few miles, at low tide, the navigable channel is narrow and restricts access for vessels with the greatest draft. The next major point of mooring below the lock is, accordingly, at Brentford Dock.

Description
The chief engineer who designed the core of the structure, F.G.M. Stoney, took out seven patents relating to sluices between 1873 and 1894. Hunt and Steward, surveyors, designed the lockhouses. Ransomes & Rapier of Ipswich designed the ironwork including the arches. The structure was built between 1891 and 1894.

The structures
The superstructure was built horizontally in three sections, the middle section forms the bulk and has, itself, three spans.

The lock is the first section, topped by the first of five ornate metal arches which spread over the other sections. The middle section has mechanically rising-to-parapet-height sluice gates forming sheets of metals above and close to the water line which is created by these structures when lowered. The final section is a set of two facing ramps in part with canoe/boat rollers.

Purpose
The lock and barrages were installed in 1894 by the Thames Conservancy to maintain a broad navigable depth of water upstream of Richmond. The rising barrage ensures upstream at least  of water is in the standard navigation channel (away from banks) to the next lock, Teddington, and an annual draw-off (an all-tides lifting of the sluice gates) takes place to enable dredging to keep the advertised  minimum channel depth.

Ownership and operation

Reasons for construction
When the London Bridge of 1209 to 1831 was demolished the removal of its bulky and elaborate piers resulted in the tides upstream returning to the rapid flows as they were downstream and before its forming of a near-barrier. That bridge was particularly dam-like when it housed 200 buildings in the Tudor period and in depictions at the time of the Great Fire of London which spared the bridge. This change, together with dredging of the lower river (lowest reaches) and construction of Teddington Lock and weir, meant that for hours of each day the Thames at Richmond, Twickenham, Ham, Petersham and northern Teddington, was a shallow watercourse running past great mud and shingle banks. The exception was after weeks of above-average rainfall when the river is known as in spate however such outflow hinders navigation upstream.  By the late 19th century water extraction above Teddington had increased to four of five of the city's main waterworks and after light or normal rainfall more barges found it impossible to navigate the reach during and for hours around the two low tides each day.  In 1890, after many years of petitioning, an Act of Parliament was enacted to build the half-lock and weir, the Richmond Footbridge, Sluice, Lock and Slipway Act 1890. This is among a small minority of Thames locks not to have been built around an island or islands (aits).

Details of design

A barge lock was constructed against the north-east ("Surrey") side. This is followed by four immense brick piers protected by large ashlar stone cutwaters (starlings). These in turn support relatively thin stone dressings reaching to the metal parapet level, carved in a classical style with reredos and cornices, supporting painted metal arches. A matching-colour balustrade is above the arches finished with black lanterns, metal pillars and simple finials. The piers house the barriers and the arches support a pair of horizontal decks (walkways). Against the opposite bank is a gently elevated slipway accessed from upstream and downstream parts of the river. As a superstructure was required to hold the suspended barriers, authorities agreed to build this in the form of two footbridges.
The bridge was formally opened on 19 May 1894 by the then Duke of York (who later became King George V), having cost £61,000.

Richmond Lock is a half-tide lock and (half-tide) barrage which incorporates a public footbridge. The footbridge crosses the conventional lock, the barrages and the slipway, which comprises three vertical steel sluice gates suspended from the footbridge structure.

For about two hours each side of the published time of high tide the three sluice gates are raised into the footbridge supports above, and river traffic can pass through the barrage unimpeded. Rowing boats and kayaks can use the roller solid slipways which reach an apex above the height of the barrages.

Historic operation
The sluice gates were manually operated by lock keepers, who lived in housing mostly contained under the pedestrian steps and landing on both banks.

From the date of the bridge's opening until some time during World War II, pedestrians were charged a toll of one (old) penny, i.e.  of a pound. However, sightseers who went onto the bridge and left from the same side had to pay tuppence (two old pence,  of a pound). The toll booths and the remains of the turnstile housings remain.  Since two unconnected footbridges exist, one either side of the sluice-gate-holding brickwork and mechanisms, four toll booths and turnstiles had to be provided to collect the tolls.

See also

 Locks on the River Thames
 Crossings of the River Thames
 List of bridges in London

References

Sources
 https://web.archive.org/web/20070928004536/http://www.thames-tideway.co.uk/richlock.shtm
 http://www.victorianlondon.org/ql/queenslondon105.htm

External links
 Richmond Lock (Tour UK)
 The Richmond Society
 Richmond Local History Society

1894 establishments in England
Bridges completed in 1894
Former toll bridges in England
Grade II* listed bridges in England
Grade II* listed buildings in the London Borough of Richmond upon Thames
Locks of London
Locks on the River Thames
Pedestrian bridges across the River Thames
Pedestrian bridges in London
Richmond, London
Tidal barrages
Tourist attractions in the London Borough of Richmond upon Thames
Transport in the London Borough of Richmond upon Thames